The  is an archaeological site located in the Funaki neighborhood of the city of Awaji, Hyōgo in the Kansai region of Japan, with the traces of a late Yayoi period settlement. The site was designated a National Historic Site of Japan in 2021.

Overview
The site is  located in a hilly area at an elevation of 150 meters in northern Awaji Island and occupies an area of approximately 500 meters east-to-west by 800 meters north-to-south. It was discovered in 1996 when a local elementary student discovered fragments of Yayoi pottery. Archaeological excavations conducted since 2016 have found the  foundations of 20 large pit-house dwellings and a large amount of pottery used for salt making, as well as fishing weights. Also, fragments of a 2nd century Chinese-made bronze mirror and shards of painted pottery have been found.  The settlement is estimated to date from the first half of the 1st century to the first half of the 3rd century.

See also
List of Historic Sites of Japan (Hyōgo)

References

External links
Awaji city  home page 

Yayoi period
Archaeological sites in Japan
History of Hyōgo Prefecture
Awaji, Hyōgo
Historic Sites of Japan